Ross Hagen (born Leland Lando Lilly; May 21, 1938 – May 7, 2011) was an American voice actor, actor, director, screenwriter and producer whose television acting credits included Daktari. His film credits included The Hellcats in 1967 and The Sidehackers in 1969. His video game credits included Red Dead Redemption and its expansion pack Undead Nightmare.

Personal life
Hagen was born in Williams, Arizona, on May 21, 1938. However, he was raised on an Oregon farm. Hagen and his first wife had two children, Bob Lilly and Julie Lilly-Beloit. He was married to his second wife, Claire Polan, an actress from 1963 until her death in 2003. Outside of acting, Hagen also served in the United States Army.

Career
Hagen began his acting career during the 1960s. His early career included guest appearances on The Virginian and The Big Valley. He was cast in the CBS television series Daktari, in 1968. He portrayed a safari photographer named Bart Jason until the end of the show in 1969. Hagen's other film credits included The Mini-Skirt Mob and Speedway in 1968, The Devil's 8 (1969), The Organization (1971), Angels' Wild Women (1972), Melinda (1972), Wonder Women (1973), Night Creature (1978), Angel (1984), Avenging Angel (1985) and Armed Response (1986). His other credits as a director and producer have included Reel Horror, The Media Madman and Time Wars. He also starred in Dinosaur Island and Fugitive Rage, both directed by Fred Olen Ray.

Hagen also played Landon Ricketts, a retired gunslinger, in the video games Red Dead Redemption and Undead Nightmare.

Death
Ross Hagen died of cancer at his home in Brentwood, Los Angeles, on May 7, 2011, at the age of 72.

Legacy
A location in 2018 video game Red Dead Redemption 2, the prequel to Red Dead Redemption in which Hagen starred in, was named Mount Hagen in the late actor's honor.

Filmography

Films

Television

Video games

References

External links

1938 births
2011 deaths
American male television actors
American male video game actors
American male film actors
American male screenwriters
Male actors from Los Angeles
People from Williams, Arizona
Male actors from Oregon
People from Brentwood, Los Angeles
Screenwriters from Arizona
Screenwriters from California